Joseph-Philippe Simon, called Lockroy (February 17, 1803 – January 19, 1891) was a French actor and playwright.

Life 
Born in Turin as the son of Baron General Henri Simon, who forbade his son's use of his surname in an artistic career, Joseph-Philippe Simon began as an actor under the pseudonym Lockroy at the Odéon-Théâtre de l'Europe and the Comédie-Française in Paris before devoting himself entirely to writing. For a few months in 1848 he served as provisional administrator of the Comédie-Française.

Lockroy married Antoinette Stephanie, the daughter of the revolutionary writer Marc-Antoine Jullien de Paris. She published two books of her own, Contes à mes nièces (Tales for my nieces, 1868) and Les Fées de la famille (Household fairies, 1886). Their son was the journalist and politician Édouard Lockroy.

Lockroy died in Paris.

Works 
 Un mariage corse, a vaudeville comedy in one act by Narcisse Fournier, Lockroy and Auguste Arnould, at the Théâtre de la Porte Saint-Martin, premiered May 26, 1832
 Passé minuit, a vaudeville comedy in one act, by Lockroy and Auguste Anicet-Bourgeois, 1839. Incidental music was added in 1868 by Louis Deffès for the Théâtre des Bouffes-Parisiens
 Les amours de Faublas, a pantomime ballet in three acts and four tables, choreography Emmanuel Théaulon, Théâtre de la Porte Saint-Martin, June 12, 1835
 Irène, a vaudeville comedy in two acts by Eugène Scribe and Lockroy, February 2, 1847
 Les dragons de Villars, an opéra comique by Eugène Cormon and Lockroy, with music by Aimé Maillart, 1856
 La reine Topaze, an opéra comique by Lockroy and Léon Battu, with music by Victor Massé, December 1856,
 Mon ami Pierrot, an opérette with music by Léo Delibes, July 1862

References

External links

French male stage actors
Administrators of the Comédie-Française
French opera librettists
19th-century French dramatists and playwrights
19th-century French male actors
Actors from Turin
1803 births
1891 deaths
19th-century French male writers
Italian emigrants to France
19th-century pseudonymous writers